Kathryn Lauren Zaremba (born September 24, 1983) is an American writer, illustrator, surface designer, business woman, singer, and former actress. She is best known for her roles as Annie Bennett Warbucks in the 1993 musical Annie Warbucks and Lisa Leeper on Full House. Zaremba also co-starred on Bringing up Jack and The Jeff Foxworthy Show, as well as making several appearances on Sisters. Her last professional screen acting credit was the 1997 Disney television film Toothless, starring Kirstie Alley. She retired from acting when she was 13. During her time on Full House she was a member of The Broadway Kids. Kathryn has an older sister named Elisabeth. She was eventually cast as Annie Bennett Warbucks in the Broadway production of Annie Warbucks. Annie Warbucks is the sequel to Annie. Annie Warbucks received mixed reviews. The show never made it to Broadway and became an Off Broadway production. Annie Warbucks premiered at The Civic Theater in San Diego, California.

Zaremba is a 2002 graduate of Broken Arrow Senior High School. She is an alumna of Kansas City Art Institute and Corcoran College of Art and Design. Zaremba works as an illustrator and surface designer. She married Jeremy Ney in 2010 and they live in Washington, D.C., where she runs her business, Kate Zaremba Company. She also co runs The Lemon Bowl.

Television and theatre credits

Recordings

Books 
 The Story of Zimbie Zooella (2013)

References

External links 

Kate Zaremba Company
The Lemon Bowl

1983 births
20th-century American actresses
21st-century American writers
Actresses from Oklahoma
21st-century American women artists
American child actresses
American musical theatre actresses
American women writers
Corcoran School of the Arts and Design alumni
Kansas City Art Institute
Living people
People from Broken Arrow, Oklahoma
Writers from Oklahoma
21st-century American actresses